A supra-entity is a conceptual element derived from the Entity-Relationship (E-R) technique for information system modeling. It is similar to an entity, but it is defined at a higher level, encompassing individual entity occurrences, their parts, groups and groups of parts or parts of groups.

The concepts supra-entity, supra-relationship and supra-attribute were created and published by González & Muller in their work “Business Entity-Relationship Model: For Innovation, Entrepreneurship and Management ”, and applied for the first time in this work to conceptually model the key elements and interrelationships of “business” reality.

Supra-entities, supra-relationships and supra-attributes have the objective of covering the diversity of situations and perspectives existing in reality, through the integrated representation at a higher level of individual occurrences, its multiple parts and groups of entities and relationships according to different criteria, its structures, its properties or attributes and its association with other supra-entities at any level of partition or grouping.

Supra-entity 

A supra-entity is formed by the individual entities, its multiple structures of entity parts, its multiple structures of entity groups and its multiple structures of groups of entity parts or parts of entity groups, associated with each other in a closed squared structure, as shown in the attached diagram.

The representation on the multiple structures of parts, groups, groups of parts or parts of entity groups that form the supra-entity is done through strips connecting the different elements, instead of the usual line symbol used for a single structure in the entity-relationship models.

For example, supra-entity Products in a business sector is as shown in the next diagram:

Application to innovation 
In addition to its application to modeling and development of databases and information systems, supra-entities and supra-relationships allow a redefinition of the concept of innovation, its degrees and types, with clarity and amplitude, which facilitates generation of ideas and innovation capacity, both in general and business.

Innovation defined in a supra-entity domain or scope consists of the creation, generation or introduction of new occurrences of supra-entity elements with good results or success, and which are first invention (major innovation) or improved (minor or incremental innovation), not including those new occurrences that replicate to other similar previous ones.

For example, if we apply this definition of innovation to the supra-entity Products, we obtain the product innovations, which consist of the creation, generation or introduction in the market of new element occurrences of the supra-entity Products with good results or success, and which are first invention (major innovation) or improved (minor or incremental innovation), not including those new occurrences that replicate to other similar previous ones.

Business innovation is traditionally identified with the introduction and marketing of new or improved products or processes in the market. But innovation does not necessarily require being technological. You can innovate by identifying new needs, new customer segments, new ways of getting the product to the customer, new forms of agreements or contracting, new environments, etc.

In summary, it is possible to innovate on the different supra-entities and supra-relationships that constitute the Business Entity-Relationship Model, achieving different types of innovations and increasing the innovation capacity of the business.

References

Further reading 
 Entity-relationship model
 Innovation

External links 
   Business Entity-Relationship Model
   Modelo Entidad-Relación del Negocio (in Spanish)

Entity–relationship model
Innovation
Data modeling diagrams
Database theory